The 2003 Michigan Wolverines football team represented the University of Michigan in the 2003 NCAA Division I-A football season.  The team's head coach was Lloyd Carr.  The Wolverines played their home games at Michigan Stadium.  The team won the first of its back to back Big Ten Championships. The team lost to the USC Trojans in 2004 Rose Bowl.

Coaching staff
Head coach: Lloyd Carr
Assistant coaches: Erik Campbell (assistant head coach), Mike DeBord, Ron English, Jim Herrmann, Fred Jackson, Scot Loeffler, Terry Malone, Andy Moeller, Bill Sheridan
Trainer: Paul Schmidt
Managers: Davon Wilson (senior manager), Bob Belke, Tom Bellen, Tom Burpee, Jeff Clancy, Brandon Greer, Brad Hoffman, Jeff Levine, Atif Lodhi, Chris Mancuso, Darin Ottaviani, Blake Postma, Brad Rosenwasser

Schedule

Game summaries

Central Michigan

Houston

For the third time in 12 seasons* Houston travelled to Ann Arbor for a game against Michigan. The Cougars had what was considered to be a unique offense that some analysts felt could possibly give the Michigan defense some problems. After a competitive 1st quarter, however, the Wolverines dominated the Cougars the rest of the way, winning the game in an epic beat-down, 50-3. * The other 2 games were played in Ann Arbor in 1992, and 1993. Michigan won both of them easily, 61-7, and 42-21 respectively (when you combine the scores of all 3 games, Michigan has outscored Houston, 143-31).

Notre Dame

Source:

Oregon

Indiana

Iowa

Minnesota

Source:

Illinois

Purdue

Michigan State

Source:

Northwestern

Ohio State

100th meeting

Rose Bowl

Roster

Statistical achievements
Chris Perry was the Big Ten rushing individual statistical champion (126.8 yards per conference games and 128.8 yards per game).  Perry set numerous current school records during the season including single-game attempts (51, November 1, 2003) surpassing Ron Johnson's 1967 record of 42, and single-season attempts (338) surpassing Anthony Thomas' 2000 record of 319.

The team led the Big Ten in passing offense for all games (270.8 yards per game), although Michigan State won the title for conference games. They were also the Big Ten scoring statistical champions for conference games (35.8 points per game), although Minnesota was the champion for all games.  They also ranked first in passing efficiency defense for both conference games (96.6) and all games (102.2). The team led the conference in total defense for conference games (286.1) and all games (316.4). The November 22 Michigan - Ohio State football rivalry game set the current conference single-game attendance record of 112,118.

Braylon Edwards posted four consecutive 100-yard reception games, surpassing Desmond Howard, Carter and Marcus Knight who all had three in various seasons. Edwards would tie this record the following season, but Mario Manningham posted six in 2007 to establish the current record. John Navarre set numerous career records: pass attempts (1366) extending his own record established the prior season; completions (765), surpassing Elvis Grbac's 1992 record of 522; passing yards (9254), surpassing Grbac's 6460.  Chad Henne broke each of these records during his career ending in 2007.  Navarre also broke his own single-season records for pass attempts (456), completions (270) and yards (3331) set the prior season. Navarre broke Tom Brady's single-game passing yards record of 375 with a 389-yard performance on October 4 against Iowa.  These single-game and single-season records still stand. The final touchdown pass of his career gave him 72, one more than Grbac for another record to be broken by Henne.  Navarre established the current records for single-season yards per game (256.2), surpassing his own record of the prior year, and career yards per game (215.2), surpassing Jim Harbaugh's 175.8.  He broke his own single-season 200-yard game record with 10 bringing his record setting career total to 28.

Awards and honors
The individuals in the sections below earned recognition for meritorious performances.

National
All-Americans: Chris Perry
Doak Walker Award: Perry
Jim Brown Trophy: Perry

Conference

Big Ten Football MVP: Chris Perry
All-Conference: John Navarre, Chris Perry, Braylon Edwards, Tony Pape
Big Ten Offensive Player of the Year: Perry
Big Ten Freshman of the Year: Steve Breaston (coaches)

Team
Co-captains: Grant Bowman, Carl Diggs, John Navarre
Most Valuable Player: Chris Perry
Meyer Morton Award: Braylon Edwards
John Maulbetsch Award: Jake Long
Frederick Matthei Award: Jason Avant
Dick Katcher Award: Grant Bowman, Norman Heuer, Larry Stevens
Arthur Robinson Scholarship Award: Andy Mingery
Hugh Rader Jr. Award: David Baas, Tony Pape
Robert P. Ufer Award: John Navarre
Roger Zatkoff Award: Lawrence Reid
Dick Katcher Award: Grant Bowman, Norman Heuer, Larry Stevens

References

External links
  2003 Football Team -- Bentley Historical Library, University of Michigan Athletics History
 2003 Michigan at NCAA.org

Michigan
Michigan Wolverines football seasons
Big Ten Conference football champion seasons
Michigan Wolverines football